The black-thighed grosbeak (Pheucticus tibialis) is a large seed-eating bird in the cardinal family, which is endemic to the mountains of Costa Rica and western Panama.

The nest is a thin cup constructed on a bulky twig base  up in a small tree or amongst vines. The female lays two brown-spotted pale blue eggs between March and May.

The male has a yellow head, rump and underparts, an olive-edged black back, and black wings, thighs and tail. There is a white patch on the flight feathers. The female is paler with more olive on the back and a smaller white wing patch. Immatures are duller and more olive-tinged, and have streaking and mottling on the body plumage.

The black-thighed grosbeak forages in shrubs or trees for insects, seeds and berries. The call is a sharp pink, and the song is a musical stream of warbles, whistles, trills and slurs.

References

External links

 
 
 
 

black-thighed grosbeak
Birds of Costa Rica
Birds of Panama
black-thighed grosbeak
black-thighed grosbeak